European Architecture Student Assembly (EASA) was founded in 1981 by architect students like Geoff Haslam and Richard Murphy and is closely related to the Winterschool concept, which organises similar events for UK students of architecture.
EASA takes place each summer in a different country, with the event usually lasting two weeks. It is organised by students of architecture for students of architecture and the concept is operated on a cooperative basis. In fall at INCM, Intermediate National Contact Meeting, the location for EASA is decided one and a half years in advance. Typically 400 students take part in the event and engage in workshops, exhibitions, lectures and social events loosely based around a specific theme. These events are run by a combination of academics and students and encompass a wide variety of activities with a greater or lesser relationship to architecture. The event is funded through a combination of attendance fees (which vary for each country based upon ability to pay), grants and sponsorship, all arranged by the organising committee for each event.

EASA has little or no formal structure in that each event is organised as a unique occurrence - though a system of National Contacts (NCs) ensures that the event each year is well supported. NCs also typically meet once a year to discuss the previous EASA and prepare for the next. Students come from over 40 European countries to the event each year. Recent Assemblies have seen students participating from the US, India and Central American countries.

EASA Summer Meetings
1981 Liverpool, England: Starting up the EASA Experience
1982 Delft, Netherlands: Architecture of an Uncertain Future
1983 Lisbon, Portugal: Social Spaces
1984 Aarhus, Denmark: Turning point in Architecture
1985 Athens, Greece: Interpretation and Action in the City
1986 Torino, Italy: Architetture Latenti
1987 Helsinki-Putikko, Finland: Architecture and Nature
1988 Berlin, Germany: The Dimension Between
1989 Marseille, France: Heritage et Creativé
1990 Karlskrona, Sweden: Exploration
1991 Verkhoturie  and Kolomna, USSR: Regeneration (This assembly was held at two sites)
1992 Ürgüp, Turkiye: Vision 2000 Environment
1993 Sandwick, Scotland: The Isle
1994 Liège, Belgium: Consommer l'Inconsumable
1995 Zamość, Poland: Beyond the Borders
1996 Clermont-l'Hérault, France: Dream Builders!
1997 The Train, Scandinavia: Advancing Architecture (This assembly was held on board a train driving through Denmark, Sweden,  and Norway)
1998 Valletta, Malta: Living on the Edge
1999 Kavala, Greece: Osmosis
2000 Antwerp and Rotterdam, Belgium/Netherlands: Dis-Similarities
2001 Gökceada, Turkey: No Theme
2002 Vis, Croatia: Senses
2003 Friland, Denmark: Sustainable Living
2004 Roubaix, France: Metropolitan - Micropolitain,
2005 Bergün, Switzerland: Trans, Transit, Transition.
2006 Budapest, Hungary: Common Places
2007 Eleusina, Greece: City Index
2008 Dublin-Letterfrack, Ireland: Adaptation
2009 Brescia, Italy: supermARCHet
2010 Manchester, UK: Identity
2011 Cadiz, Spain: deCOASTruction
2012 Helsinki, Finland: Wastelands
2013 Žužemberk, Slovenia: Reaction
2014 Veliko Tărnovo, Bulgaria: Symбиоза
2015 Valletta, Malta: Links
2016 Nida, Lithuania: Not Yet Decided
2017 Fredericia, Denmark: Hospitality. Finding the framework
2018 Rijeka, Croatia: RE:Easa
2019 Villars-sur-Ollon, Switzerland: EASA:Tourist 
2020 Valga, Estonia: Apathy
2021 Kragujevac, Serbia: Reality
2022 Călărași, Romania: 1:1
2023 Sheffield, United Kingdom: Commons

INCM (Intermediate National Contact Meeting)
The INCM is held every year in autumn. They are the main event next to the assembly to keep the continuity of easa. There have been such memorable meetings like Berlin 1990, where the "Lichterfelder statement" was made. The "Lichterfelder Statement" later became the "easa-guide" developed, which is updated yearly at the NC-meetings.
1985 Barcelona, Spain
1986 Vienna, Austria
1987 Budapest, Hungary
1988 Oslo, Norway
1989 Kraków, Poland
1990 Plovdiv, Bulgaria 
1991 Berlin, Germany (Lichterfelder statement)
1992 Torino, Italy
1993 Ljubljana, Slovenia
1994 Tallinn, Estonia
1995 Zürich, Switzerland
1996 Istanbul, Turkey
1997 Sinaia, Romania
1998 Sandomierz, Poland
1999 Mannheim, Germany
2000 Tal-Fanal, Gozo, Malta
2001 Berlin, Germany
2002 Bornholm, Denmark
2003 Ljubljana, Slovenia
2004 Belgrade, Serbia
2005 Brighton, United Kingdom
2006 Moscow, Russia
2007 Motovun, Croatia
2008 Nicosia, Cyprus
2009 Schaan, Liechtenstein
2010 Copenhagen, Denmark
2011 Baku, Azerbaijan
2012 Vienna, Austria
2013 Bucharest, Romania
2014 Berlin, Germany
2015 Glasgow-Forres, Scotland
2016 Madrid, Spain
2017 Lapland, Finland
2018 Vitosha, Bulgaria
2019 Trpejca, Macedonia
2020 Latvia (Online)
2021 Leuven, Belgium
2022 Palanga, Lithuania

SESAM (Small European Architecture Students Assembly Meeting)
The SESAM is an event arranged by the EASA network. Like the basic idea of the EASA, a SESAM can give an addition and/or alternative to the education of the students. The independence and off-university-character creates an informal atmosphere. The SESAM is a workshop with a small number of participants. Through this concentrated character the SESAM allows to work on a tight theme. After a number of similar events in the year before in Italy, the Netherlands, Czechoslovakia, etc., the first EASA workshop with the name SESAM was realized 1992 in Vilafamés  (Valencia, Spain, October 1992, 50 participants). SESAM2007 was held in Aarhus, Denmark on 23–25 November 2007. The next scheduled SESAM meeting is due to take place in 2021 in Slavutych, Ukraine.

Pivo SESAM 
The event is an excuse to meet with the other members of the network. It usually takes place during the New Year celebrations.

EASA Newspaper: Umbrella
Each year, during EASA, one of the workshops is dedicated to cover the event by reporting about events and workshops in a newspaper-like fashion. This workshop and hence the newspaper is typically called umbrella, or variation of the local word for umbrella. This newspaper is usually published on a daily basis and has been an integral part of EASA since the early 1980s. In recent years, The Umbrella Workshop has also embraced new media, and has run EASA TV during the event. In 2009 EASA TV was a workshop of its own for the first time, but with integral co-operation with Umbrella.

EASA TV
EASA.TV tries to cover as much of the assembly as possible and the material is then edited, screened on site at the assembly and uploaded online. The participants will learn how to plan episodes, write scripts, draw storyboards, record with DSLR cameras and edit and export with software such as Adobe Premiere Pro. But most of all they will get the chance to document the very essence of EASA, the EASA spirit. Since 2007

EASA FM
EASA FM is a temporary radio station that was started in EASA011, Cadiz/Spain.

External links
EASA 2019 (CH)
EASA INDEX website started in 2014
EASA platform (beta) started in 2011
EASA
RE:EASA 2018 (HR)
EASA 2014 (BG)
EASA 2013 (SI)
EASA 2012 (FI)
EASA 2011 (ES) 
EASA 2010 (UK)
EASA 2008 (IRE)
EASA 2007 (GR)
EASA 2006 (HU)
EASA 2005 (CH)
EASA 2004 (FR)
EASA 2003 (DK) 
EASA 2002 (HR)
EASA's Latin American Counterpart
Umbrella 2003
Umbrella 2004
Collection of recent years Umbrellas
EASA guide
EASA FM on SoundCloud

Photo pages
Jelk's EASA page
Marko's EASA Page
Flickr
...more photo links

References

Architectural education
Meetings